Mount Owen can refer to:
Mount Owen (New Zealand)
Mount Owen, California, former name of Brown, California
Mount Owen (British Columbia) in the Canadian Rockies
Mount Owen (Antarctica)
Mount Owen (Colorado) in the Ruby Range of Colorado, USA
Mount Owen (Tasmania) in the West Coast Range of Tasmania, Australia
Mount Owen (Wyoming) in the Teton Range of Wyoming, USA